Debregeasia longifolia also known as Orange Wild Rhea, is a large shrub growing up to a height of 5 meters seen in wet areas from plains to 1500m. Commonly found in India, Sri Lanka, Myanmar, Indo-China, west China and Malesia. In Matupi Township, Chin, Debregeasia longifolia is also known as Haikaeng Thing.   Its wood is used for making charcoal and fiber used for fishing-lines. The fiber extracted from bark is used for house construction.

References

External links
 Details and pictures
 Debregeasia longifolia : Orange Wild Rhea

longifolia
Flora of Asia
Taxa named by Nicolaas Laurens Burman